Parmouti 14 - Coptic Calendar - Parmouti 16

The fifteenth day of the Coptic month of Parmouti, the eighth month of the Coptic year. In common years, this day corresponds to April 10, of the Julian Calendar, and April 23, of the Gregorian Calendar. This day falls in the Coptic Season of Shemu, the season of the Harvest.

Commemorations

Martyrs 

 The martyrdom of Saint Alexandra the Empress

Saints 

 The departure of Pope Mark VI, the 101st Patriarch of the See of Saint Mark

Other commemorations 

 The consecration of the Church of Saint Agabus, one of the Seventy Disciples 
 The consecration of the Church of Saint Nicholas of Myra

References 

Days of the Coptic calendar